The 1896 South Bend Commercial-Athletic Club football team was an American football team that represented the South Bend Athletic Club in the 1896 football season.   The club was established in 1896, with the headquarters being opened on September 30th, ahead of the upcoming football season.  The club compiled a 1–1–1 record, and was outscored by their opponents 56 to 38.

Schedule

References

South Bend Commercial-Athletic Club
South Bend Commercial-Athletic Club football seasons
South Bend Commercial-Athletic Club football